The British Columbia Liberal Party, often shortened to the BC Liberals, is a centre-right provincial political party in British Columbia, Canada. The party currently forms the Official Opposition. Subsequent to the 2020 British Columbia general election, then–party leader Andrew Wilkinson announced his resignation on October 26, 2020, but remained as interim leader until Shirley Bond was chosen as the new interim leader on November 23; the party held a leadership election in 2022, which was won by Kevin Falcon.

Until the 1940s, British Columbia politics were dominated by the Liberal Party and rival British Columbia Conservative Party. The Liberals formed government from 1916 to 1928 and again from 1933 to 1941. From 1941 to 1952, the two parties governed in a coalition (led by a Liberal leader) opposed to the ascendant Co-operative Commonwealth Federation. The coalition was defeated in 1952 and the Liberal Party went into decline, with its rump caucus merging into the Social Credit Party of British Columbia for the 1975 election. It returned to the legislature as Official Opposition in the 1991 election, through the efforts of leader Gordon Wilson. At this time, the Social Credit Party had collapsed, leaving a window for the BC Liberals to become the dominant centre to centre-right party. Wilson lost a leadership challenge to Gordon Campbell in 1994. In the 2001 election, the BC Liberals won an overwhelming majority, which they held under Campbell and his successor Christy Clark until the 2017 election. This election resulted in a hung parliament, with the caretaker Liberal government soon losing a confidence vote to the NDP. Following this defeat, Clark resigned as Liberal leader and Rich Coleman was selected as the interim leader. Andrew Wilkinson was elected leader in the 2018 leadership election, and in the 2020 election lost to incumbent BC premier John Horgan. Wilkinson subsequently resigned as leader of the BC Liberals and the party's caucus selected Shirley Bond as interim leader.

Once formally affiliated with the Liberal Party of Canada, the British Columbia Liberal Party became independent in 1987. In British Columbia's current party system, the BC Liberals are the main centre-right opposition to the centre-left NDP. The party commonly describes itself as a "free enterprise coalition", and party members typically support both the Liberal and Conservative parties in federal elections. Eight Liberal leaders have served as premier of British Columbia: Harlan Brewster, John Oliver, John MacLean, Duff Pattullo, John Hart, Boss Johnson, Gordon Campbell, and Christy Clark. The party has been described as conservative, neoliberal, and being on the centre-right of the left–right political spectrum.

History

1916–1928: First government
The divided Conservatives faced the Liberals in the election of 1916 and lost. The Liberals formed a government under Harlan Carey Brewster. Brewster had become leader of the Opposition, and was elected party leader in March 1912. He lost his seat a few weeks later in the 1912 election, which returned no Liberals at all.

In 1916, he won election to the legislature again through a by-election, and led his party to victory in a general election later that year by campaigning on a reform platform. Brewster promised to end patronage in the civil service, end political machines, improve workman's compensation and labor laws, bring in votes for women, and other progressive reforms.

The government brought in women's suffrage, instituted prohibition, and combated political corruption before his unexpected death in 1918. He is interred in the Ross Bay Cemetery in Victoria, British Columbia.

John Oliver succeeded Brewster as premier when Brewster died in 1918. Oliver's government developed the produce industry in the Nanook Valley, and tried to persuade the federal government to lower the freight rate for rail transport. The party managed a bare majority win in the 1920 election and only managed to govern after the 1924 election with the support of the 2 Independent Liberals.

1928–1933: Opposition and the Great Depression
The Liberals managed to increase their vote in the 1928 election but lost close to half their seats. With the onset of the Great Depression and the implosion of the government of Simon Fraser Tolmie, the Liberals won the 1933 election.

1933–1941: Duff Pattullo
The 1933 election brought into power Duff Pattullo and introduced into the Legislature the Co-operative Commonwealth Federation (CCF), a new social-democratic and democratic socialist opposition party.

Pattullo wanted an activist government to try to deal with the depression through social programs and support of the unemployed. Canada has been recognized as the hardest hit by the Great Depression, and western Canada the hardest hit within Canada. Pattullo's attempts were often at odds with the federal government in Ottawa.

Pattullo was also an advocate for British Columbia, and suggested the annexation of Yukon by BC, and the construction of the Alaska Highway to reduce the power of eastern Canada over BC. In the 1937 general election, his government was re-elected running on the slogan of "socialized capitalism".

1941–1951: "The Coalition"
The alternating government with the Conservatives came to an end with the rise of the CCF who managed to be Official Opposition from 1933 to 1937 and were one seat less than the Conservatives in the 1937 election. In the 1941 election the CCF came second. The election did not give the Liberals the majority they hoped for.

John Hart became the premier and Liberal leader in 1941 when Pattullo refused to go into coalition with the Conservatives. The Liberal members removed Patullo as leader and Hart formed a Liberal-Conservative coalition government, known in BC history as "The Coalition ". From 1941 to 1945, Hart governed at a time of wartime scarcity, when all major government projects were postponed. The coalition government was re-elected in the 1945 election. In that contest, Liberals and Conservatives ran under the same banner.

After 1945, Hart undertook an ambitious program of rural electrification, hydroelectric and highway construction. Hart's most significant projects were the construction of Highway 97 to northern British Columbia (which is now named in his honour) and the Bridge River Power Project, which was the first major hydroelectric development in British Columbia. He established the BC Power Commission, a forerunner of BC Hydro, to provide power to smaller communities that were not serviced by private utilities. In December 1947, Hart retired as premier. The Conservative Party agitated for its leader, Herbert Anscomb, to succeed Hart as premier but the Liberals outnumbered the Tories in the coalition caucus and Hart was followed by another Liberal, Byron Johnson, known as "Boss" Johnson, with Anscomb as deputy premier and minister of Finance.

Johnson's government introduced universal hospital insurance and a 3% provincial sales tax to pay for it. It expanded the highway system, extended the Pacific Great Eastern Railway, and negotiated the Alcan Agreement, which facilitated construction of the Kenny Dam. The government also coped with the 1948 flooding of the Fraser River, declaring a state of emergency and beginning a program of diking the river's banks through the Fraser Valley. Johnson is also noted for appointing Nancy Hodges as the first female Speaker in the Commonwealth.

The Liberal-Conservative coalition government won the 1949 election – at 61% the greatest percentage of the popular vote in BC history. Tensions had grown between the coalition partners and within both parties. The Liberal Party executive voted to terminate the coalition and Johnson dropped his Conservative ministers in January 1952, resulting in a short lived minority government which soon collapsed.

1952 election
In order to prevent the CCF from winning in a three party competition, the government introduced instant-runoff voting, with the expectation that Conservative voters would list the Liberals as their second choice and vice versa. Voters however, were looking for alternatives. More voters chose British Columbia Social Credit League ahead of any other party as their second choice. Social Credit went on to emerge as the largest party when the ballots were counted in the 1952 general election. Social Credit's de facto leader during the election, W. A. C. Bennett, formerly a Conservative, was formally named party leader after the election.

At the 1953 general election, the Liberals were reduced to 4 seats, taking 23.36% of the vote. Arthur Laing defeated Tilly Rolston in Vancouver Point Grey. Although Social Credit won a majority of seats in the legislature, their finance minister Einar Gunderson was defeated in Oak Bay by Archie Gibbs of the Liberals. Gordon Gibson Sr, a millionaire timber baron, nicknamed the "Bull of the Woods", was elected for Lillooet as a Liberal.

1953–1975: Third party status
During the early period of this time, the Liberals' most prominent member was Gordon Gibson, Sr. He was a cigar-smoking and gregarious logging contractor who could have been premier but for a major political error. He was elected in 1953 for the Lillooet riding. In 1955, the Sommers scandal surfaced and he was the only leader in the legislature to make an issue of it. W. A. C. Bennett and his attorney general tried many tactics to stop the information from coming out.

In frustration, Gordon Gibson Sr. resigned his seat and forced a by-election, hoping to make the Sommers scandal the issue. The voting system had changed, and he came a close second after Social Credit.

In the 1956 election, with the Sommers scandal still not resolved, the Liberals fared worse than in 1953. Arthur Laing lost his seat, and the party was reduced to two MLAs and 20.9% of the vote. In the 1960 election, the party won four seats with the same 20.9% of the popular vote as in 1956. In the 1963 election, the party's caucus increased by one more MLA to five, but their share of the popular vote fell to 19.98%. The 1966 election, the party won another seat, bringing its caucus to six, and had an increase in the vote to 20.24%. In the 1969 vote, the party lost one seat, and its share of the vote fell to 19.03%.

In 1972, the party was led into the election by a new leader, David Anderson, who had been elected in the 1968 federal election as an MP for the Liberal Party of Canada. He and four others managed to be elected to the legislature, but with the lowest vote in party history at 16.4%.

After the British Columbia New Democratic Party (BC NDP) won the 1972 election, many supporters of the Liberal and Conservative parties defected to the Social Credit League. This coalition was able to keep the New Democrats out of power from 1975 until the 1990s. MLAs Garde Gardom, Pat McGeer and Allan Williams left the Liberals for Social Credit along with Hugh Curtis of the suddenly rejuvenated Tories. All of them became members of Social Credit Cabinets after 1975.

In the 1975 election, the only Liberal to be elected was Gordon Gibson Jr. as the party scored a dismal 7.24%. David Anderson was badly defeated in his Victoria riding, placing behind the New Democrats and Social Credit.

1979–1991
The 1979 election was the party's lowest point. For the first time in party history, it was shut out of the legislature. Only five candidates ran, none were elected, and the party got 0.5% of the vote.

The 1983 election saw a small recovery as the party came close to a full slate of candidates, but won 2.69% of the vote. The 1986 vote was the third and last election in which the party was shut out. Its share of the popular vote improved to 6.74%.

In 1987, Gordon Wilson became the leader of the provincial Liberal Party when no one else was interested. Wilson severed formal links between the provincial Liberal party and its federal counterpart. Since the mid-1970s, most federal Liberals in BC had chosen to support the British Columbia Social Credit Party at the provincial level. For the provincial party, the intent of this separation was to reduce the influence of Social Credit members of federal party. From the federal party's perspective, this move was equally beneficial to them, as the provincial party was heavily in debt.

Wilson set about to rebuild the provincial party as a credible third party in British Columbia politics. During the same period, the ruling Social Credit party was beset by controversy under the leadership of Bill Vander Zalm. As a result, multiple Social Credit scandals caused many voters to look for an alternative.

By the time of the 1991 election, Wilson lobbied to be included in the televised Canadian Broadcasting Corporation (CBC) debate between Vander Zalm's successor, Premier Rita Johnston and BC NDP leader Michael Harcourt. The CBC agreed, and Wilson impressed many voters with his performance. The Liberal campaign gained momentum, and siphoned off much support from the Social Credit campaign. While the BC NDP won the election, the Liberals came in second with 17 seats. Wilson became leader of the Opposition.

Official Opposition under Wilson: 1991–1994
Wilson's policies did not coincide with many other Liberals both in the legislature and in the party who wanted to fill the vacuum left by the collapse of Social Credit. The Liberals also proved themselves to be inexperienced, both in the legislature and in building a broad-based political movement. They had a difficult time to build a disciplined organization that could mount an effective opposition against the New Democratic Party provincial government.

In 1993, Wilson's leadership was further damaged by revelations of his affair with fellow Liberal MLA Judi Tyabji. By this time, most of the caucus was in open revolt against his leadership. Wilson agreed to call for a leadership convention, at which he would be a candidate. Delta South MLA Fred Gingell became the leader of the Opposition while the Liberal leadership race took place.

Soon, former party leader Gordon Gibson and Vancouver Mayor Gordon Campbell entered the leadership race. Campbell won decisively on the first ballot, with former party leader Gordon Gibson placing second and Wilson third. The leadership election was decided on a one-member, one vote system through which Liberals voted for their choices by telephone.

Wilson and Tyabji then left the Liberals and formed their own party, the Progressive Democratic Alliance.

Official Opposition under Campbell: 1994–2001
Once Campbell became leader, the Liberals adopted the moniker "BC Liberals" for the first time, and soon introduced a new logo and new party colours (red and blue, instead of the usual "Liberal red" and accompanying maple leaf). The revised name and logo was an attempt to distinguish itself more clearly in the minds of voters from the federal Liberal Party of Canada.

In early 1994, Campbell was elected to the legislature in a by-election. Under his leadership, the party began moving to the right. Some supporters of the federal Reform Party of Canada and former Social Credit members became attracted to the BC Liberals. Some moderate Socreds had begun voting Liberal as far back as the Vander Zalm era. The Liberals won two former Socred seats in by-elections held in the Fraser Valley region, solidifying their claim to be the clear alternative to the existing BC NDP government. The Liberal party also filled the vacuum created on the centre-right of the BC political spectrum by Social Credit's collapse.

In the 1996 election, the BC Liberals won the popular vote. However, much of the Liberal margin was wasted on large margins in the outer regions of the province; they only won eight seats in Vancouver and the Lower Mainland. In rural British Columbia, particularly in the Interior where the railway was the lifeblood of the local economy – the BC Liberals lost several contests because of discomfort that the electorate had with some of Campbell's policies, principally his promise to sell BC Rail. The net result was to consign the Liberals to opposition again, though they managed to slash the NDP's majority from 13 to three.

After the election, the BC Liberals set about making sure that there would be no repeat of 1996. Campbell jettisoned some of the less popular policy planks in his 1996 platform, most notably a promise to sell BC Rail, as the prospect of the sale's consequences had alienated supporters in the Northern Interior ridings.

Campbell government: 2001–2011
After a scandal-filled second term for the BC NDP government, the BC Liberals won the 2001 election with the biggest landslide in BC history, taking 77 of 79 seats. They even managed to unseat Premier Ujjal Dosanjh in his own riding. Gordon Campbell became the seventh premier in ten years, and the first Liberal premier in almost 50 years.

Campbell introduced a 25% cut in all provincial income taxes on the first day he was installed to office. The BC Liberals also reduced the corporate income tax and abolished the corporate capital tax for most businesses (a tax on investment and employment that had been introduced by the New Democrats).

Campbell's first term was also noted for fiscal austerity, including reductions in welfare rolls and some social services, deregulation, the sale of some government assets (in particular the "Fast ferries" built by the previous government, which were sold off for a fraction of their price). Campbell also initiated the privatization of BC Rail, which the Liberals had promised not to sell in order to win northern ridings which had rejected the party in 1996 but reversed this promise after election, with criminal investigations connected with the bidding process resulting in the BC Legislature Raids of 2003 and the ensuing and still-pending court case. There were several significant labour disputes, some of which were settled through government legislation but which included confrontations with the province's doctors. Campbell also downsized the civil service, with staff cutbacks of more than fifty percent in some government departments, and despite promises of smaller government the size of cabinet was nearly doubled and parliamentary salaries raised. Governance was also re-arranged such that Deputy Ministers were now to report to the Chief of Staff in the premier's office, rather than to their respective ministers. In the course of the cuts, hospitals, courthouses and extended care facilities around the province were shut down, particularly in smaller communities, and enforcement staff such as the BC Conservation Service were reduced to marginal levels. Various provincial parks created during the previous NDP regime were also downgraded to protected area status, meaning they could be opened for resource exploitation, and fees for use of parks were raised.

In 2003, a drug investigation known as Operation Everwhichway led to raids on government offices in the British Columbia Parliament Buildings in relation to suspect dealings concerning the sale of BC Rail to CN in a scandal which has since become known as Railgate and the trial of four former ministerial aides for influence peddling, breach of trust and accepting bribes.

The Liberals were re-elected in the 2005 election with a reduced majority of 7 seats (46–33). The Liberals were again re-elected in the 2009 election.

Shortly after this election the introduction of the HST was announced, contrary to promises made during the election campaign.

On November 3, 2010, facing an imminent caucus revolt over his management style and the political backlash against the Harmonized Sales Tax (HST) and the controversial end to the BC Rail corruption trial and with his approval rating as low as 9% in polls, Gordon Campbell announced his resignation.

Clark government: 2011–2017
The party's 2011 leadership convention was prompted by Gordon Campbell's request to the party to hold a leadership convention "at the earliest possible date". The convention elected Christy Clark as its new leader of the party on February 26, 2011. Clark and her new Cabinet were sworn in on March 14.

Under Clark, the party charted a more centrist outlook while continuing its recent tradition of being a coalition of federal Liberal and federal Conservative supporters. She immediately raised the minimum wage from $8/hour to $10.25/hour and introduced a province-wide Family Day similar to Ontario's. Clark became premier during the aftermath of the 2008-09 recession, and continued to hold the line on government spending, introducing two deficit budgets before a balanced one for the 2013-14 fiscal year, which included a tax hike on high-income British Columbians. She also sought to take advantage of BC's liquified natural gas (LNG) reserves, positioning the budding LNG industry as a major economic development opportunity over the next decade. While the final years of Gordon Campbell's administration had seen far-reaching and progressive environmental legislation enacted, Clark was more measured in her approach to environmental policy. While continuing with BC's first-in-North-America carbon tax, she promised to freeze the rate during the 2013 election and her LNG development aspirations seemed to contradict greenhouse gas emissions targets set by the Campbell government in 2007. She also announced in 2012 that any future pipeline that crosses BC would have to meet five conditions that included environmental requirements and Aboriginal consultation. Controversially, she indicated that one of her five conditions would be that BC receives its "fair share" of any revenues that accrue from increased pipeline and tanker traffic. This has put her in direct conflict with the province of Alberta, who sought increased market access for its bitumen through BC ports, yet adamantly refuse any arrangement which would see BC receive any royalties.

During the 2013 election, Clark entered the campaign low in public opinion polls and trailing her main rival, Adrian Dix of the NDP, by as much as 20 points. The BC Liberals campaign slogan was "Strong Economy, Secure Tomorrow" and highlighted a balanced budget and strong development opportunities in the LNG sector as a reason for voters to elect them for a fourth term in office. Clark brought in strategists affiliated with the Ontario Liberal Party, such as Don Guy and Laura Miller, and federal Liberal figures, such as Mike McDonald, to run her office and campaign. The BC Liberals came from behind to secure a fourth term in office, however Clark was defeated in her Vancouver riding, but won a subsequent by-election in the Okanagan riding of Westside-Kelowna. After the election, she sought a thawing of relations between BC and Alberta over future pipeline projects, signing onto former Alberta premier Alison Redford's National Energy Strategy. In early 2014, the Liberals brought down a second straight balanced budget and introduced legislation to change BC's liquor laws to allow liquor sales in some grocery stores and allow children to sit with adults in pubs and restaurants where liquor is served.

In the 2017 election, the BC Liberals' seat count was reduced to 43, one seat short of a majority. On May 29, 2017, after final vote counting had completed, the BC NDP and the BC Green Party agreed to a confidence and supply agreement to ensure a stable minority government. Their combined 44 seats give them an advantage over the BC Liberals' 43 which was sufficient to defeat Clark's government on a confidence vote on June 29, 2017, after which Clark resigned as premier (effective July 18, 2017) and the lieutenant-governor asked NDP leader John Horgan to form a government.

Rich Coleman became the party's interim leader following Clark's resignation.

Official Opposition under Wilkinson: 2018–2020

Andrew Wilkinson was elected party leader on February 3, 2018. He served as leader of the Opposition for two years. After the party was defeated in the 2020 general election, he resigned. Shirley Bond served as the party's interim leader until the 2022 leadership contest.

Name change: 2022 
The party announced on November 16, 2022, that its name will change from "BC Liberals" to "BC United". The name change is to be ratified in 2023.

Party leaders

Source: Legislative Library of British Columbia

Election results

Source: Elections BC

British Columbia Young Liberals
The British Columbia Young Liberals Commission leads the youth wing of the party. The executive board is elected at an annual general meeting and is composed of five youth members: the president, vice president Communications, vice president Events, vice president Operations, and vice president Outreach. As of September 2022, these positions are held by Harman Khosa, Teddy O'Donnell, Olivia Wankling, Mark Dhillon and James Lehmann, respectively.

See also

 List of political parties in British Columbia
 List of premiers of British Columbia
 List of British Columbia general elections
 British Columbia Liberal Party leadership elections
 BC Legislature Raids
 BC Rail
 Harmonized Sales Tax
 Sales taxes in British Columbia

Notes

References

Citations

External links
 BC Liberal Party official website

Conservative parties in Canada
Liberal parties in Canada
Liberal conservative parties
Organizations based in Vancouver
Political parties established in 1903
Liberal Party
Liberal Party
Neoliberal parties